Richard D. Bronson may refer to:

Richard Bronson (born 1941), American mathematician
Richard "Skip" Bronson, American real estate developer